Rafael Díaz Ycaza (October 24, 1925 - August 28, 2013) was an Ecuadorian poet, novelist, short story writer, and columnist for the Ecuadorian newspaper El Universo.

He is the author of many books of poetry, and also wrote novels. His first published work was Statues at Sea (1946) and the last was Pure Beast Alba, a poem anthology, published in September 2007.

Rafael Díaz Ycaza rose to prominence with his poems at a young age, earning a reputation as a poet of great talent. He became one of the most popular and respected poets of Guayaquil and the country. Ycaza also wrote prose. He was also a journalist, writing the column 'Bottle Sea' in El Universo for several years. He also occupied the position of president of the Guayas branch of the House of Ecuadorian Culture. His stellar career and contributions to Ecuadorian literature were acknowledged in 2011, when he was awarded the Eugenio Espejo National Award.

Awards
 The "Premio Eugenio Espejo" National Award in Literature
 The "Aurelio Espinoza Pólit" National Award
 The "José de la Cuadra" Short Story Award
 The "Medardo Ángel Silva" National Poetry Award 
 The "Ismael Pérez Pazmiño" Award
 The "Carlos Zevallos Menéndez" Medal

Works

Poetry
 Estatuas en el mar (1946)
 Cuaderno de bitácora (1949)
 Las llaves de aquel país (1954)
 El regreso y los sueños (1959)
 Botella al mar (1965)
 Zona prohibida (1972)
 Señas y contraseñas -antología- (Guayaquil, 1978)
 Mareas altas: canciones y elegías (Guayaquil, 1993)

Novels
 Los rostros del miedo (Guayaquil, 1962)
 Los prisioneros de la noche (Quito, 1967)

Short Stories
 Las fieras (Guayaquil, 1952)
 Los ángeles errantes (Guayaquil, 1958)
 Tierna y violentamente (Guayaquil, 1970)
 Porlamar (Guayaquil, 1977)
 Porlatierra (Quito, 1978)
 Prometeo el joven y otras morisquetas (Quito, 1986)
 Consta en las antologías: El nuevo relato ecuatoriano (Quito, 1951)
 Pensamiento y literatura del Ecuador: crítica y antología (Quito, 1972)
 Antología del relato ecuatoriano (Quito, 1973)
 Cuento ecuatoriano contemporáneo (s.f.); 
 Madrugada: una antología de la poesía ecuatoriana (Guayaquil, 1976)
 Lírica ecuatoriana contemporánea (Bogotá, 1979)
 Poesía viva del Ecuador (Quito, 1990)
 La palabra perdurable (Quito, 1991)
 Así en la tierra como en los sueños (Quito, 1991)
 Cuento contigo (Guayaquil, 1993)
 Antología básica del cuento ecuatoriano (Quito, 1998)
 Cuento ecuatoriano de finales del siglos XX (Quito, 1999).

References 

1925 births
2013 deaths
20th-century Ecuadorian poets
Ecuadorian novelists
Ecuadorian male short story writers
Ecuadorian short story writers
People from Guayaquil
20th-century novelists
Ecuadorian journalists
Male journalists
Ecuadorian male poets
Male novelists
20th-century short story writers
20th-century male writers